Margaret Collins Weitz (born May 24, 1929) is a professor emeritus at Suffolk University. Weitz is the author of books and many articles on French culture, French women, and the role of women in the French Resistance.

Dr. Weitz graduated from St. Ursula’s High School in Toledo, Ohio and went on to obtain her bachelor's degree from Ohio State University in humanities in 1953. She was awarded a Fulbright grant and proceeded to study for the next two years at University of Poitiers. After studying at Poitiers, she became the first Fulbright scholar to lecture at University of Aix-Marseilles. She later returned to the United States and earned her M.A. from Ohio State University in Romance Languages and Literature. She taught at OSU's Department of Comparative Literature between 1961 and 1969. While at OSU, she met her husband, Morris Weitz. The couple moved to Boston, where Margaret Weitz enrolled in Harvard, eventually earning a Ph.D in 1975. She spent five years teaching at Harvard University in a number of departments. In 1984, she moved became an Associate Professor of Humanities and Modern Languages at Suffolk University, where she remained for eighteen years.

Her primary research interests dealt with French topics and women. Some of her most notable publications are Sisters in the Resistance: How Women Fought to Free France 1940-1945, which was published in 1996 and inspirared a 2006 play by the same name; Combattantes de l’ombre: Histoire des Françaises dans la Résistance, which was published 1997 and was awarded the Prix Litteraire de la Resistance.

For her work, she has received decorations from the French government, including the grade of Officer of the Ordre des Palmes Académiques and the Chevalier grade of the Ordre national du Mérite in 2003.

Dr. Weitz  is the mother of Richard Weitz, a senior fellow at the Hudson Institute, David Weitz, a researcher at MIT Lincoln Laboratory, and Catherine Weitz, a scientist at the Planetary Science Institute.

References

Suffolk University faculty
Ohio State University College of Arts and Sciences alumni
Harvard University alumni
Recipients of the Ordre des Palmes Académiques
Knights of the Ordre national du Mérite
Writers from Toledo, Ohio
1929 births
Living people
Ohio State University Graduate School alumni